The Dingo Scout Car was a light armoured car built in Australia during World War II. They were produced by the Ford motor company during 1942.

History
Australia as a nation was ill-prepared for the Second World War and possessed little in the way of armoured vehicles. Being at the time unable to purchase them from their traditional supplier, the United Kingdom whose industrial output was dedicated to more immediate needs in Europe, they were forced by circumstance to develop and build them from what resources were available in Australia, and armoured cars and scout cars were no exception. Much creative application and innovation was spawned by the lessons learnt from the Great War.

The Dingo was based on a commercial Ford 30-cwt 134.5 inch wheelbase chassis shortened to 110 inches, which was fitted with a Marmon-Herrington all wheel drive kit to give the vehicle 4 wheel drive. It was powered by either an 85 hp or 95 hp Ford V8 engine. On to this was fitted an armoured body manufactured from ABP-3 (Australian Bullet Proof plate type 3) by Victorian Railways. Serial production began in early 1942.

The Dingo was equipped with a Bren light machine gun and Mk19 wireless. The vehicle's weight restricted its off-road mobility and the front axle could be distorted when travelling over rough terrain. A lighter version with only 10 mm of armour and an open top was proposed at the end of 1942 but not proceeded with as armoured cars could now be imported from overseas. All 245 vehicles produced were disposed of in 1945.

Surviving Dingos are on display at the Royal Australian Armoured Corps (RAAC) tank museum at Puckapunyal, Victoria, at the Australian War Memorial, at the Melbourne Tank Museum in Narre Warren, and at the Australian Armour and Artillery Museum in Cairns. There are also several vehicles in private ownership.

Notes

References
 Cecil, Michael K. (1993). Australian Scout and Armoured Cars 1933 to 1945, Australian Military Equipment Profiles, vol. 3, .

External links

Old CMP – Dingo
The Australian Dingo Scout Car at Mheaust.com.au

World War II scout cars
World War II armoured fighting vehicles of Australia
Military vehicles introduced from 1940 to 1944